Man and Beast is a 1963 CCC Film West German-Yugoslavian war film directed by Edwin Zbonek. It was entered into the 13th Berlin International Film Festival.

Cast
 Götz George as Franz Köhler, concentration camp prisoner
  as Hauptsturmfuhrer Willi Köhler, camp commandant and Franz's Brother
 Katinka Hoffmann as Vera
 Helmut Oeser as Deserter
 Herbert Kersten as Lederer
 Kurt Sobotka as SS-Man Kasche
 Alexander Allerson as SS-Man Goldap
 Petar Banićević as Stani
 Stanko Buhanac as Blanchi
 Nada Kasapić as Mother
 Marijan Lovrić as Rademacher
 Nikola Popović as Albert

References

External links

1963 films
1963 drama films
1960s war drama films
Yugoslav war drama films
German war drama films
West German films
1960s German-language films
Films about Nazi Germany
German black-and-white films
Yugoslav black-and-white films
Films directed by Edwin Zbonek
Films about brothers
German World War II films
Yugoslav World War II films
1960s German films